Exning is a village and civil parish in the West Suffolk district of Suffolk in eastern England.

The nearest large town is Newmarket.

The most conspicuous building in Exning is the church of St Martin, which is visible from the A14.

History
Local lore reputes Exning to have been the capital of the Iceni tribe and therefore the home of Queen Boadicea (Boudicca).

At the time of William the Conqueror, Exning was in Staploe Hundred. Later, the settlement was in the Liberty of Ely. When the powers of the Liberty were reduced, some of its territory returned to Suffolk, including Exning – albeit as a part of Lackford Hundred, where it would remain until the Victorian period. For several centuries, the part of Suffolk centred on Exning was almost an enclave of the county within the confines of Cambridgeshire. The parish of Newmarket All Saints was transferred from Cambridgeshire to this virtual enclave in 1894, but it continued to be practically detached until boundary changes in the area widened considerably the "bridge" between it and the rest of Suffolk a hundred years later.

Exning is reputed to have been the birthplace of Saint Ethelreda, to whom the cathedral at Ely is dedicated, though this is disputed.

A spring at Exning was named St Wendreda's Well, and a local legend had it that the seventh-century Saint Wendreda used its water for healing. Newmarket jockeys used to take horses there to drink before a race.

The Rosery Hotel is an early Victorian building which was frequently visited by Queen Mary.

During the Second World War, the headquarters of No. 3 Group of RAF Bomber Command were located in Harraton House. Nearby Newmarket Heath, the northwest corner of which borders on Exning, was used as an airfield for, amongst others, Stirling III Bombers of No. 75 (NZ) Squadron RAF. Little evidence remains of this chapter in Exning's history, apart from a single aircraft hangar on Heath Road, Burwell (near the One Thousand Guineas Connect service station on the A14 trunk road) and a memorial plaque on the racecourse.

See also
Landwade, a neighbouring village that was formerly in Cambridgeshire but is now part of Exning parish

References

External links

Exning Parish Council
Exning history and pictures
St Martin, Exning
Photos of Exning today
Exning Cricket Club
Exning parish churches
Walk Round Exning

Villages in Suffolk
Forest Heath
Civil parishes in Suffolk